The Giro del Belvedere is a professional cycling race held annually in the Treviso province, Italy. It has been part of the UCI Europe Tour since 2005 in category 1.2U, meaning it is reserved for U23 riders.

Winners (since 2000)

References

Cycle races in Italy
UCI Europe Tour races
Recurring sporting events established in 1923
1923 establishments in Italy